The Soviet RG-42 (Ручная Граната образца 42 года > Ruchnaya Granata obraztsa 42 goda, "Hand Grenade pattern of [19]42 year") was a fragmentation grenade designed by S.G. Korshunov.

It was originally introduced during World War II from 1942 onwards as an emergency measure to replace the complex RGD-33 grenade. It continued in use with the USSR and its Warsaw Pact allies in the post-war period until replaced in 1954 by the RGD-5 grenade. Stockpiles were held for emergency or reserve issue, military aid, or foreign sales. They were eventually destroyed in the 1980s due to the TNT filling degrading and becoming unsafe.

Unlike the RGD-33, the RG-42's components were simple to produce and assemble. Only the fuze required specialized manufacture and the parts could be easily assembled by hand by cottage labor. Partisans often made copies of the simple design when out of contact.

It contained about 200 grams of explosive charge (TNT) in a cylindrical stamped-metal can. It used the 3.2 to 4 second UZRGM fuse, also used in the RGD-5, RG-41, and F1 grenades.

The grenade could be thrown about 35–40 meters and has an effective blast radius of around 10 meters.

The total weight of the grenade with the fuse was 420 grams.

Foreign copies
 : Type 42 grenade.

Users

 
 
 : were used at least until 1997
 : Used during civil conflicts in 1990s
 : were used at least until 2019
 : were used at least until 2018

References

External links
 Finnish Junkyard
 

Hand grenades of the Soviet Union
World War II infantry weapons of the Soviet Union
Fragmentation grenades
Weapons and ammunition introduced in 1942